Mott Mill is a historic cotton mill and silk mill located at Yonkers, Westchester County, New York. The property includes an 1852 stone mill building with a reinforced concrete addition dated to 1906.  The rectangular mill building is a four-story, three bay utilitarian gray fieldstone structure with segmented arched windows.  The reinforced concrete addition is four stories high and measures 237 feet wide and 73 feet deep. It was used as a mill and carpet factory until the 1930s when it became home to the Cleanart Laundry Co.  The complex was converted into housing for the elderly in the early 2000s.

It was added to the National Register of Historic Places in 2004.

References

External links
Hudson Valley Ruins website

Houses on the National Register of Historic Places in New York (state)
Houses completed in 1852
Buildings and structures in Yonkers, New York
Houses in Westchester County, New York
Silk mills in the United States
Cotton mills in the United States
National Register of Historic Places in Yonkers, New York
1852 establishments in New York (state)